Gorom-Gorom is a town in northern Burkina Faso. Its name translates as "you sit down, (and) we'll sit down", reminiscent of its role as an important crossroads in the Sahel. It is the capital of Oudalan Province.

Known for its market and many mosques, it attracts large numbers of Tuaregs, Bella, Fula and other traders every week. Gold is mined nearby in Essakane.

Gorom-Gorom has a small airport approximately 2 km North East of the town.

In literature
Gorom-Gorom is the setting for the Sophie books, written by British children's author Stephen Davies: Sophie and the Albino Camel (2006, Andersen Press), Sophie and the Locust Curse (2007) and Sophie and the Pancake Plot (2008).

Gorom-Gorom also figures in the book 'Man kan ikke vaske én hånd' (One can't wash one hand) by the Danish author Thyge Christensen who writes about travelling by bicycle from the city of Aarhus in central Jutland to Gorom-Gorom in 1981.A journey that covered 4,200 km and took 2 months to complete.

References

External links
 
Burkina Faso, Off the Beaten Track
Gorom-Gorom, Under the Acacias

Populated places in the Sahel Region